The Behna are the Muslim community found in the state of Gujarat, Rajasthan, Uttar pradesh, Bihar, and north India.

History and origin

The word Behna comes from the Sanskrit behn or seed.

Present circumstances

Their historical traditional occupation of cotton carding was affected by industrialisation, therefore many adopted manufacturing. They are successful businessmen. This community are no longer as cotton carder and cotton industrialists. They entered in different  different  sectors and getting well educations. They allow marriages in their own caste, some times they can allow marriage  with the same status caste.

Until some times ago no name in this community as surname, now some people using Pathan/Khan and some using  as a surname because the ancestor's of this community were Persian Muslims and from Afghanistan.

The are Sunni Muslim of the Barelvi & Deoband sect. They speak Urdu, and various dialects of Hindi. Their customs are similar to other Uttar Pradesh Muslims.

Many members of this community migrated to Pakistan in 1947 and have settled in Karachi.

See also
 Shaikhs in South Asia
 Osmani

References

Muslim communities of Delhi
Shaikh clans
Muslim communities of Uttar Pradesh
Muslim communities of Pakistan